FRAK engine is a JavaScript library/API for creating interactive 3D applications using WebGL. The purpose of the library is to provide an API for making easier developing 3D content for the web, games and other interactive applications. FRAK engine is developed by 3D Technologies R&D. It was originally free for personal use, but required a license from 3D Technologies for commercial usage; it is now licensed under the BSD license and hosted on GitHub.

FRAK engine features

Rendering 

The rendering engine uses industry standard  WebGL API what ensure cross-platform deployability.
 
 Real-time shadows   
 Dynamic textures   
 transparency (computer graphics)|Transparency 
 Octree generation   
 Occlusion culling

Resource Management 
 Automatic caching and loading
 Textures: types supported by browsers (jpg, png etc.)
 Shaders: glsl
 Materials: json based
 Fonts: support for bitmap fonts generated with BMFont

Many supported 3D file formats 
Currently, the following 3D file formats are supported using our converter see the list below:

FRAK and javascript 
FRAK engine is a javascript library and submitting the content also takes place in javascript. Subsequently we have an example about uploading a 3D model.

Example code can be downloaded here.

See also
 WebGL

External links

http://www.frakengine.com
3D Technologies R&D

References

3D graphics software
Animation software